Oquawka is a village in Henderson County, Illinois, United States. The population was 1,371 at the 2010 census. It is the county seat of Henderson County.

Oquawka is part of the Burlington, IA–IL Micropolitan Statistical Area.

Geography
Oquawka is located at  (40.938880, -90.949044).

Demographics

2010 census
As of the census of 2010, there were 1,371 people, 627 households, and 378 families living in the village. The racial makeup of the village was 98.61% White, 0.07% African American, 0.36% Native American, 0.14% Asian, and 1.30% from two or more races. Hispanic or Latino of any race were 1.46% of the population.

There were 627 households, out of which 22.6% had children under the age of 18 living with them, 44.3% were married couples living together, 10.8% had a female householder with no husband present, and 39.7% were non-families. 34.3% of all households were made up of individuals, and 36.5% had someone living alone who was 65 years of age or older.  The average household size was 2.19 and the average family size was 2.79.

In the village, the population was spread out, with 21.1% under the age of 18, 3.4% from 18 to 24, 21.2% from 25 to 44, 29.7% from 45 to 64, and 21.8% who were 65 years of age or older.  The median age was 46 years. For every 100 males there were 98.4 females.  For every 100 females age 18 and over, there were 99.3 males.

The median income for a household in the village was $28,750, and the median income for a family was $50,938. Males had a median income of $40,729 versus $25,500 for females. The per capita income for the village was $17,703.  About 12.6% of families and 19.4% of the population were below the poverty line, including 32.4% of those under age 18 and 15.6% of those age 65 or over.

2000 census
As of the census of 2000, there were 1,539 people, 656 households, and 421 families living in the village. The racial makeup of the village was 98.38% White, 0.06% African American, 0.13% Native American, 0.13% Asian, and 1.30% from two or more races. Hispanic or Latino of any race were 0.71% of the population.

There were 656 households, out of which 26.8% had children under the age of 18 living with them, 51.2% were married couples living together, 8.5% had a female householder with no husband present, and 35.8% were non-families. 31.6% of all households were made up of individuals, and 16.2% had someone living alone who was 65 years of age or older.  The average household size was 2.31 and the average family size was 2.87.

In the village, the population was spread out, with 22.4% under the age of 18, 8.2% from 18 to 24, 27.0% from 25 to 44, 23.7% from 45 to 64, and 18.7% who were 65 years of age or older.  The median age was 40 years. For every 100 females, there were 93.8 males.  For every 100 females age 18 and over, there were 90.9 males.

The median income for a household in the village was $32,500, and the median income for a family was $38,152. Males had a median income of $29,333 versus $18,571 for females. The per capita income for the village was $15,254.  About 8.4% of families and 12.8% of the population were below the poverty line, including 17.6% of those under age 18 and 11.4% of those age 65 or over.

History
The Sac and Fox tribe once thrived on flatlands that gently fold into the Mississippi River. They called the area Oquawkiek, meaning “yellow banks.” White settlers arrived and kept the peace, thanks to Stephen S. Phelps, the founder of the village of Oquawka, who harbored respect for the native peoples. Phelps would befriend Abraham Lincoln, who was said to spend a lot of time visiting Oquawka. Here, long before his presidency, Lincoln supposedly met Jefferson Davis, then a faithful officer with the U.S. Army. And in 1858, Lincoln made a stump speech here, as did his rival and another Phelps family friend, Stephen Douglas, the first circuit judge in this seat of Henderson County.

That period saw the peak of commerce in Oquawka, as a mill and shipping concern. Civic leaders saw great promise for growth, but — in a familiar story from the 19th century — that went to the wayside when railroads went elsewhere. Still, Oquawka survives well as a village, with 1,539 residents and a half-shuttered downtown that supports locals as well as visiting boaters. In fact, east-west Illinois Route 164 stops in — not at, but in — the river, where the pavement slopes into the waterway to accommodate boat trailers.

Norma Jean
On July 17, 1972, the circus was in town. The main attraction of the Clark & Walter Circus was a 29-year-old elephant named Norma Jean.

As nightfall approached, head elephant caretaker "Possum Red" tethered Norma Jean to a tree at the village park in the center of town, using a metal chain to hook her up. Not long after, in rolled storm clouds. A bolt of lightning ripped through the sky and found Norma Jean’s tree — the only one in the park. The voltage fired through the tree, along the metal chain, and into Norma Jean. Possum Red, who was still on the scene, was thrown  by the electrical blast. Norma Jean thudded to the ground, lifeless. Possum Red and the rest of the circus scurried out of town. The following year, without its lone elephant — uninsured and worth the then-princely sum of $10,000 — the circus folded. 

Townsfolk used a backhoe to dig a  hole, rolled the three-ton-plus pachyderm corpse into the grave and marked it with a plywood sign. Atop the monument, they secured a concrete elephant statue and ringed the wall with flowers. They affixed a glass case to the wall with newspaper accounts about Norma Jean. The plaque on the wall proclaims:

 

When they finished they invited hundreds of well-wishers to the dedication. They even rented a baby elephant to carry a wreath in its trunk to lay at the marker. Meloan became something of a sideshow barker for Norma Jean. He printed professional postcards of the memorial, selling them in Oquawka and beyond to drum up tourism. When reporters came calling, he’d gush over the lore of Norma Jean.

John Behnke, a graduate student from Southern Illinois University's cinema program, filmed a 15-minute documentary on the marker, which later appeared on Showtime. By the mid-1990s, the site averaged two visitors a day. Tourism would get a boost when Oquawka would host a yearly fest to honor Norma Jean, with an elephant walk, white elephant sale and a bake sale featuring elephant ears.

Meloan, Norma Jean’s biggest supporter, died in 2004. Norma Jean has gone from a headline to a footnote. Hardly anyone ever stops by the grave anymore. A few years ago, unknown vandals destroyed the original elephant atop the memorial. The village got a replacement, but locals otherwise no longer pay much notice to the grave.

1993 Flood
During the month of July, The Flood of 1993 turned Oquawka into an island. There was no getting in, and no getting out. Oquawka, which sits above the Mississippi, for the most part stayed dry. The roads didn’t. Due to flash flooding of all the creeks, the town was cut off from the outside world for at least a day and a half.

2008 Flood
On the early morning of June 14, the town of Oquawka, Illinois was evacuated, due to a levee breach along the swollen Iowa River. The city council believed this would affect the flood waters in the already flooding Mississippi River. The same day two levees broke near the town of Keithsburg, Illinois, flooding the entire town.

Notable People

 Charles Lincoln Edwards, zoologist
 Todd Hamilton, PGA pro golfer, 2004 PGA Tour Rookie of the Year
 Charles M. Harris, U.S. Representative, Illinois 4th district (1863-1865)
 James McKinney, U.S. Representative, Illinois 14th District (1905-1913)
 Joyce Ricketts, AAGPBL pro baseball player (1953-1954)

Attractions
 Delabar State Park

References

External links 

 Official Website
 Village of Oquawka (official Facebook page)
 Delabar State Park (IL DNR website)

Villages in Henderson County, Illinois
Illinois populated places on the Mississippi River
County seats in Illinois